Carol Newsom may refer to:

 Carol Newsom (photographer)
 Carol A. Newsom, biblical scholar